Saitkulovo (Häyetqol) is a rural locality (a village) in Burangulovsky Selsoviet, Abzelilovsky District, Bashkortostan, Russia. The population was 461 as of 2010. There are 2 streets.

Geography 
Saitkulovo is located 36 km northwest of Askarovo (the district's administrative centre) by road. Ishkildino is the nearest rural locality.

References 

Rural localities in Abzelilovsky District